Dimensional stability (in fabric) is the change of dimensions in textile products when they are washed or relaxed. The change is always expressed relative to the dimensions before the exposure of washing or relaxing. Shrinkage is also called residual shrinkage and measured in percentage. The major cause of shrinkages is the release of stresses and strains introduced in manufacturing processes. Textile manufacturing is based on the conversion of fiber into yarn, yarn into fabric, includes spinning, weaving, or knitting, etc. The fabric passes through many inevitable changes and mechanical forces during this journey. When the products are immersed in water, the water acts as a relaxing medium, and all stresses and strains are relaxed and the fabric tries to come back to its original state. The dimensional stability of textile materials is an important quality parameter. Failing and unstable materials can cause deforming of the garments or products. Shrinkage is tested at various stages, but most importantly before cutting the fabric into further sewn products and after cutting and sewing prior to supplying the products to buyers and consumers. It is a required parameter of quality control to ensure the sizes of the products to avoid any complaints regarding deformation or change in dimensions after domestic laundry. The tests are conducted with provided specifications of buyers imitating the same conditions like washing cycle time, temperature and water ratio and fabric load and sometimes top loading and front loading washing machines are chosen to authenticate the test and assurance of the results. This procedure provides standard and alternate home laundering conditions using an automatic washing machine. While the procedure includes several options, it is not possible to include every existing combination of laundering parameters. The test is applicable to all fabrics and end products suitable for home laundering.

Types of shrinkage 
Shrinkage is a change in dimensions across the length and width of the fabric after washing, usage, and when exposed to the relaxing of fabrics. Mainly shrinkage is of two types. One is minus shrinkage and the other is plus shrinkage. Skew (twisting of the vertical grains) is also observed along with shrinkage. Abnormal twisting is also considered as a non-conformity. 
 Contraction: Any noticeable decrease in dimensions is known as Contraction (minus) shrinkage.
 Expansion: Any noticeable increase or expansion in dimension is known as Expansion (plus) shrinkage.

Causes

 Composition and properties
Composition and content determine the type and percentage of fibres. Natural fibres shrink more than synthetic fibres. Synthetic fibres are more stable due to their crystalline and thermoplastic nature. They do not shrink, whereas natural fibres are more prone to shrink because of more amorphous regions in their fibre structure which allows more absorption of water, swelling of fibres and increased lubricity increase the shrinking tendency. Blended fabrics normally synthetic and natural are also considered more stable.
 Structure of the fabric/ knit or weave, loose and tight structure
The textile products which are loosely woven or knitted are prone to shrink more and tightly knitted and woven products are more stable. In knitted fabrics the structure is competitively loose and flexible. Knitting structures are constructed by interlocking the loops. Whereas in weaving yarns  are interlaced at right angles to form a  stable fabric.
 Finishing applications and procedures
Fibers to fabric conversion lead to many mechanical tensions and forces during manufacturing, which includes following steps for fibre to yarn conversion with spinning then fabric with weaving, and knitting.
When the products are immersed in water, the water acts as a relaxing medium and all stresses and strains get relaxed and try to come back to its original relaxed state. Even after finishing with sophisticated finishing machines, some residual shrinkage remains, which is carried forward to the garment stage. This residual shrinkage may cause deformity or de-shaping of the products after domestic laundry. There are certain acceptance limits of shrinkage levels for every product. Abnormal shrinkage levels are considered a non-conformity to quality standards.

Test methods 
The different test methods are used as per the final destination of the product (Europe, U.S.A., etc.) and the expected washing or laundry methods in practice. Mainly I.S.O. and AATCC standards are used for shrinkage testing. There are few brands which are customizing the test method as per their quality norms.
Test Method(s):

 AATCC Test Method 135
 AATCC Test Method 150
 ISO 6330
 CAN/CGSB 58

AATCC Test Method 135, dimensional change of fabrics after home laundering Scope: determines the dimensional changes of garments when subjected to home laundering procedures used by consumers. The method is for fabric not yet made into a garment. A sample is marked with benchmarks before home laundering. Then it is laundered 3 times total, then the benchmarks are measured again. Before and after laundering benchmarks are compared.

AATCC Test Method 150, Dimensional Change of Fabrics After Home Laundering Scope: Determines the dimensional changes of garments when subjected to home laundering procedures used by consumers.

Importance 
Shrinkage has great significance because any expansion or shrinkage can cause deformation of the product, which could be a severe concern for the end-user, and the brand can lose its reputation. Secondly, in the garment-making industry, consumption of the fabric is calculated in yards, so any variance than permissible limits is unacceptable. Preshrunk fabrics and garments are also available.

Shrinkage controlling methods

There are various physical and chemical methods to minimize the residual shrinkage of the fabrics.

 It starts with the right selection of yarn count or denier to achieve particular g.s.m(Grams per square meters)
 Appropriate loop or weaves density/tightness factor of loops (which is called loop length. Chemical treatments like mercerizing of cotton,
 Resination of cotton in case of woven materials.
 Heat setting, Pre-heat-setting and post-heat setting of synthetic and blended fabrics Heat setting is a thermal process taking place mostly in either a steam atmosphere or a dry heat environment. The effect of the process gives fibers, yarns or fabric dimensional stability). 
 Finishing on machines like sanphorizing Mechanical shrinking (sometimes referred to as sanforizing), whereby the fabric is forced to shrink width and/or lengthwise, creates a fabric in which any residual tendency to shrink after subsequent laundering is minimal compacting machines.
 For wool garments, shrinkage is due to scales on the fibers which heat, water, and agitation cause to stick together.  Other fabrics are stretched by mechanical forces during production and can shrink slightly when heated (though to a lesser degree than wool). 
 Some clothes are shrunk in the factory to avoid this problem.
 Wash care label is like a manual of the garment, customers should refer the wash care instructions before putting their clothes in washing. The wash care label infers about handling the garment such as washing, drying (tumble or line dry), and ironing. Sometimes expensive and sensitive clothes may require dry clean to avoid shrinkage and any kind of distortions.

See also
 Finishing (textiles)
 List of laundry topics

External links
 https://sciencetrends.com/science-behind-clothes-shrink-polyester-viscose-cotton

References

Laundry
Fibers
Properties of textiles